Joseph McGhee (9 July 1929 – 17 April 2015) was a Scottish marathon runner, who won a gold medal at the 1954 British Empire and Commonwealth Games in Vancouver, Canada.

Career
McGhee was a member of Shettleston Harriers athletics club, and also the Glasgow University Hares and Hounds.

McGhee won the marathon event at the 1954 British Empire and Commonwealth Games in Vancouver, Canada. The event was run in sublime heat, and Englishman Jim Peters had been leading the race by 17 minutes coming into the stadium, but collapsed. Only six runners finished the race, out of 16 starters.  McGhee had been the only Scot in the race, and his victory was overshadowed in the press by coverage of Peters' collapse. McGhee won the 1954, 1955 and 1956 Scottish National Championships, making him the first Scotsman to win three successive marathon championships. Fraser Clyne later achieved the same feat in 1992–94.

Personal life
McGhee attended St Francis' RC Primary school, and St Modan's High School in Stirling. He later studied at the University of Glasgow from 1946 until 1951. McGhee later became a flight lieutenant in the RAF. McGhee also worked as a teacher, during which time he taught Mike Ryan. Ryan later said he thought of McGhee as he won his bronze medal at the 1968 Summer Olympics in Mexico City. McGhee wrote an autobiography entitled The Forgotten Winner, which was never published.

He married in 1960, and had five children and six grandchildren.

References

1929 births
2015 deaths
Scottish male marathon runners
Sportspeople from Falkirk
Athletes (track and field) at the 1954 British Empire and Commonwealth Games
Commonwealth Games gold medallists for Scotland
Commonwealth Games medallists in athletics
Alumni of the University of Glasgow
20th-century Royal Air Force personnel
People educated at St Modan's High School
Medallists at the 1954 British Empire and Commonwealth Games